Events from the year 1426 in France

Incumbents
 Monarch – Charles VII

Events
 6 March - English forces under John, Duke of Bedford win a victory at the Battle of St. James in Normandy as part of the Hundred Years' War

Births
 19 September - Marie of Cleves, Duchess of Orléans, mother of Louis XII (died 1487)
 Unknown - John II, Duke of Bourbon, soldier and Constable of France (died 1488)
 Unknown - Jacques de Luxembourg, Seigneur de Richebourg, French noble (died 1487)

Deaths
 16 February - Jean-Allarmet de Brogny, Cardinal (born 1342)

References

1420s in France